St Jerome at Prayer is an oil-on-canvas painting executed ca. 1630–1635 by the French artist Georges de La Tour. He produced it for the abbey of Saint Antoine a Viennois, but it was confiscated by the state on the French Revolution and is now in the Museum of Grenoble. An autograph copy with some variations was produced sometime before 1642 and is now in the Nationalmuseum in Stockholm.

Bibliography in French
Pierre Rosenberg, Marina Mojana, Georges de La Tour, catalogue complet des peintures, Paris, Bordas 1992
Dimitri Salmon: "Saint Jérôme pénitant dit aussi Saint Jérôme au chapeau cardinalice", i Dimitri Salmon et al.: Saint Jérôme & Georges de La Tour, Vic-sur-Seille 2013

Paintings in the collection of the Nationalmuseum Stockholm
1630s paintings
Paintings by Georges de La Tour
de La Tour
Books in art
Paintings in the collection of the Museum of Grenoble